Nigrán is a municipality of Galicia, Spain in Pontevedra Province, within the metropolitan area of Vigo, the most populous city in Galicia. Nigrán has a surface of 35 km2, with a population of approximately 18,000 people divided into seven parishes: Nigrán, Panxón, San Pedro, Parada, Camos, Chandebrito and Priegue. Nigran's population practically triples in the summer months. It is on the Atlantic coast of Spain and is considered a summer destination for tourists due to its beaches and mild summer weather.

See also
:Category:People from Nigrán

References

External links 

 Concello de Nigrán
 Information on Nigrán
 
 Photographs of Nigrán
 Photographs of Puerto de Panxón
 Nigrán Public Library

Municipalities in the Province of Pontevedra